Rob Delaney's Stand Up Central (formerly known as Russell Howard's Stand Up Central and Chris Ramsey's Stand Up Central) is a British stand-up comedy television show. It started broadcasting on Comedy Central on 29 April 2015, and ran for ten episodes.

The series features Delaney performing stand-up in front of a live audience at the Electric Ballroom in Camden and answering questions from social media. Each week also features two guests performing stand-up. The second series began broadcasting on 25 May 2016.

In 2017, it was announced a third series was ordered, with Chris Ramsey replacing Howard, who could not return to present the series due to touring commitments. In 2018, for the fourth series, the host was Rob Delaney.

Episodes

Series 1 (2015)

Series 2 (2016)

Series 3 (2017)

Series 4 (2018)

References

External links
Official website

2010s British comedy television series
2015 British television series debuts
British stand-up comedy television series
Comedy Central (British TV channel) original programming
English-language television shows